Ivan Andreyevich Luzhnikov (born 11 April 1980) is a former Russian professional football player.

Club career
He played in the Russian Football National League for FC Fakel Voronezh in 2005.

Honours
 Russian Second Division Zone South top scorer: 2004 (29 goals).

References

External links
 

1980 births
Footballers from Moscow
Living people
Russian footballers
Association football forwards
Association football midfielders
FC Dynamo Stavropol players
FC Fakel Voronezh players
FC Chernomorets Novorossiysk players
FC Dynamo Saint Petersburg players
FC Mordovia Saransk players
FC Tyumen players
FC Sakhalin Yuzhno-Sakhalinsk players
FC Volga Ulyanovsk players